Thivim railway station (Station code: THVM) is one of the main railway stations for North Goa at Tivim (also called Thivim). It is part of the North South line and almost every trains do have service for this station.

Background
While the station has only two platforms, it is the most important stop for trains in North Goa. This is the alighting point for all wishing to go to any part north of the Mandovi river in Goa, the North Goa tourist belt, and the talukas of Bardez and Pernem among others.

Karmali railway station, some eight kilometres away from the state capital Panjim or Panaji, is closer for those wishing to reach central Goa, including the state capital. Margao, which the railway authorities refer to as Madgaon railway station is a bigger station, and is best connected for those wanting to reach South Goa, including the beach belt of that locality.

History
Tivim came on the rail route of India, after the building of the Konkan Railway in the 1990s. The Konkan Railway is a link between Mumbai and Mangalore on the west coast of India. It traverses a distance of  along the Western Ghats region of India, and passes through some verdant landscape. Overall, the Konkan Railway has some 91 tunnels and 171 major bridges "some of which have found mention in the record books". It connects Maharashtra and Karnataka. The Konkan Railway was inaugurated on January 26, 1998.

Location
It is located just off the Mapusa–Bicholim road at Thivim, Bardez, North Goa 403502, Goa.

Infrastructure
The station comprises a single diesel BG (broad-gauge) track. It is a regular station, with two platforms. It has some 38 halting trains, with no originating or terminating trains from the station.

This station lies at an elevation of 23 m above sea level, and is part of the Konkan Railway/Konkan zone, in the division of Karwar.

Services available
The Tivim/Thivim station  offers the Shravan Seva, a service to help senior citizens in carrying their luggage. This is available by sending an SMS on 96640 44456 four hours in advance of the journey, with details of the PNR number, coach number and berth number of the travelling citizen (as of August 2016).

References

External links

Railway stations in North Goa district
Railway stations along Konkan Railway line
Railway stations opened in 1997
Karwar railway division